João Manuel Bernardo is the ambassador of Angola to the Socialist Republic of Vietnam. He visited the PRC in November 2007.

See also
 Angola-China relations

References

Living people
Year of birth missing (living people)
Ambassadors of Angola to China
Ambassadors of Angola to Cuba
Education ministers of Angola
Governors of Malanje